, WAB 78, is a patriotic song composed by Anton Bruckner in  during his stay in St. Florian.

History 
Bruckner composed this work on a text of an unknown author  during his stay in St. Florian. He dedicated it to Hans Schläger, the founder of the St. Florian choir.

The original manuscript is stored in the archive of the St. Florian Abbey. It was performed on 11 November 1921 in St. Florian by Franz Xaver Müller for the 25th anniversary of the composer's death.

Lyrics
"Das Lied vom deutschen Vaterland" uses lyrics by an unknown author.

Music 
The 20-bar long work in D-flat major is scored for  choir. The sung begins with a Bruckner's typical octave leap in all four voices.

In 1906, Franz Xaver Müller added three additional strophes to the song.

Discography 
There is a single recording of Das Lied vom deutschen Vaterland:
 Thomas Kerbl, Männerchorvereinigung 12, Weltliche Männerchöre – CD: LIVA 054, 2012

References

Sources 
 August Göllerich, Anton Bruckner. Ein Lebens- und Schaffens-Bild,  – posthumous edited by Max Auer by G. Bosse, Regensburg, 1932
 Anton Bruckner – Sämtliche Werke, Band XXIII/2:  Weltliche Chorwerke (1843–1893), Musikwissenschaftlicher Verlag der Internationalen Bruckner-Gesellschaft, Angela Pachovsky and Anton Reinthaler (Editor), Vienna, 1989
 Cornelis van Zwol, Anton Bruckner 1824–1896 – Leven en werken, uitg. Thoth, Bussum, Netherlands, 2012. 
 Uwe Harten, Anton Bruckner. Ein Handbuch. , Salzburg, 1996. .

External links 
 
 Das Lied vom deutschen Vaterland Des-Dur, WAB 78 – Critical discography by Hans Roelofs 

Weltliche Chorwerke by Anton Bruckner
1845 compositions
Compositions in D-flat major
German patriotic songs
Songs about Germany